Rita Felski (born 1956) is an academic and critic, who holds the John Stewart Bryan Professorship of English at the University of Virginia and is a former editor of New Literary History. She is also Niels Bohr Professor at the University of Southern Denmark (2016–2021).

Felski is a prominent scholar in the fields of aesthetics and literary theory, feminist theory, modernity and postmodernity, and cultural studies. She is closely associated with the field of postcritique, a school of thought that tries to find new forms of reading and interpretation that go beyond the methods of critique, critical theory, and ideological criticism. Felski is the author of Beyond Feminist Aesthetics: Feminist Literature and Social Change (Harvard UP, 1989), The Gender of Modernity (Harvard UP, 1995),  Doing Time: Feminist Theory and Postmodern Culture (New York UP, 2000), Literature After Feminism (Chicago UP, 2003), and Uses of Literature (Blackwell, 2008). The Limits of Critique (Chicago UP, 2015), an assessment of the role of the hermeneutics of suspicion as a mood and method in literary studies, has been widely reviewed. Felski is the editor of Rethinking Tragedy (Johns Hopkins, 2008) and co-editor of Comparison: Theories, Approaches, Uses (Johns Hopkins, 2013), Critique and Postcritique (Duke UP 2017), and Latour and the Humanities (Johns Hopkins, 2020).  She has also published articles in numerous essay collections and in such scholarly journals as PMLA, Signs, New Literary History, Modernism/Modernity, Cultural Critique, Theory, Culture and Society, and New Formations. Her most recent book, Hooked: Art and Attachment, was published by the University of Chicago Press in 2020.

Education 
Felski received an honors degree in French and German literature from Cambridge University and her PhD from the Department of German at Monash University in Australia.

Career 

Before coming to the University of Virginia in 1994, she taught in the Program for English and Comparative Literature at Murdoch University in Perth. She served as Chair of the Comparative Literature Program at Virginia from 2004 to 2008.

From 2003 to 2007 Felski served as U.S. editor of Feminist Theory. She has also served on the editorial boards of Modernism/Modernity, Modern Fiction Studies, The International Journal of Cultural Studies, Criticism, and Echo: A Music-Centered Journal.
Her work has been translated into Korean, Chinese, Russian, Polish, Swedish, Hungarian, Italian, Croatian, French, German, Spanish, Portuguese, and Turkish.

She has held fellowships at the Society for the Humanities at Cornell University, the Commonwealth Center for Literary and Cultural Change at the University of Virginia, and the Institut für die Wissenschaften vom Menschen (IWM) in Vienna, and was the recipient of an Australian Research Council Major Grant. In 2000, she was awarded the William Parker Riley Prize for the best essay in PMLA. In 2010, she received a Guggenheim Fellowship. In 2016 she was awarded a Niels Bohr Professorship by the Danish National Research Foundation and spent fall semesters at the University of Southern Denmark in the following five years. Rita Felski received an Honorary Doctorate from the University of Southern Denmark in 2016 and will receive an Honorary Doctorate from the University of Turku in 2021. In 2021 she gave the Clark Lectures at Trinity College Cambridge.

Books and articles
Hooked: Art and Attachment. University of Chicago Press, 2020 
 Latour and the Humanities. Johns Hopkins University Press, 2020
 Critique and Postcritique. Duke University Press, 2017
The Limits of Critique. University of Chicago Press, 2015.
Comparison: Theories, Approaches, Uses. Johns Hopkins University Press, 2013.
"After Suspicion," Profession, 2009.
"Everyday Aesthetics," Minnesota Review 71, 2009.
Uses of Literature. Blackwell, 2008.
Rethinking Tragedy, editor. Johns Hopkins University Press, 2008.
Literature After Feminism. University of Chicago Press, 2003.
"Modernist Studies and Cultural Studies," Modernism/Modernity, 10:3, 2003.
 
Doing Time: Feminist Theory and Postmodern Culture. New York University Press, 2000.
"Nothing to Declare: Identity, Shame and the Lower Middle Class," PMLA 115:1, 2000.
"The Invention of Everyday Life," New Formations 39, 1999/2000.
"The Doxa of Difference," Signs 23:1, 1997.
The Gender of Modernity. Harvard University Press, 1995.
Beyond Feminist Aesthetics: Feminist Literature and Social Change. Harvard University Press, 1989.

References

External links

Rita Felski's Faculty Page at the University of Virginia
New Literary History Homepage
A Manifesto of Positive Aesthetics: Review of Uses of Literature
Understanding Reading: Review of Uses of Literature
Are We Postcritical: Review of The Limits of Critique 
Meta-critic No. 2: How to live in a post-critical World, a review of Rita Felski, "The Limits of Critique" 
Expert Textpert: Review of The Limits of Critique 
ALH Online Review, Series VI 1: Review of The Limits of Critique

University of Virginia faculty
Monash University alumni
Alumni of the University of Cambridge
Living people
American feminists
American literary critics
Women literary critics
Feminist theorists
Postmodern feminists
1956 births
American women critics